Ali Mahmoud is Lebanese-Canadian basketball player.

Career
Mahmoud was born on May 28, 1983, in Ottawa, Ontario, Canada, to Toufic and Gina Mahmoud, who had immigrated to Canada.

He played with St. Patrick's High School Fighting Irish 1999 to 2002 and for one academic year, in 2002-2003, in University of Ottawa Gee-Gees. In 2003, Mahmoud was offered a professional contract by Champville SC, a Lebanese club in Division A. One year later, he moved to another Lebanese club Al Riyadi, where he stayed playing there until 2016. Afterwards, he joined Byblos Club for one year before returning to Al Riyadi.

Mahmoud is also a member of the Lebanon national basketball team that participated in the 2006 FIBA World Championship which took place in Japan and in 2010 FIBA World Championship in Turkey. He is 1.83m and plays as a point guard (PG).

In the 2010 FIBA World Championship, he was the 2nd best stealer.

On January 23, 2013, it was noted in several publications, including FIBA.com, that he would be making his return to national team play and represent Lebanon in upcoming international tournaments.

Clubs 
2002–2003: Ottawa CIS starting five
2003–2004: Champville SC (Lebanon-Div.A, starting five): 6.8ppg, 3.7rpg, 2.9apg, 2.1spg
2004–2005: Sporting Al Riyadi Beirut (Lebanon-Div.A): 25 games: 8.7ppg, 5.2rpg, 4.9apg, Steals-1(3.1spg), 2FGP: 58.0%, 3FGP: 37.0%
2005–2006: Sporting Al Riyadi Beirut (Lebanon-Div.A)
2006–2007: Sporting Al Riyadi Beirut (Div.A): 18 games: 9.8ppg, 5.5rpg, 6.6apg, 2.9spg, 2FGP: 47.2%, 3PT: 32.7%, FT: 67.7%
2007–2008: Sporting Al Riyadi Beirut (Lebanon-Div.A): 19 games: 9.6ppg, 6.2rpg, 4.3apg, 2.0spg, 2FGP: 50.0%, 3PT: 37.8%, FT: 51.4%
2008–2009: Sporting Al Riyadi Beirut (Lebanon-Div.A, starting five): 23 games: 12.2ppg, 5.9rpg, Assists-1 (6.3apg), 2.0spg, 2FGP-3 (61.8%), 3PT: 30.1%, FT: 56.9%
2009–2010: Sporting Al Riyadi Beirut (Lebanon-Div.A, starting five)
2010–2011: Sporting Al Riyadi Beirut (Lebanon-Div.A)
2011–2012: Sporting Al Riyadi Beirut (Lebanon-Div.A)
2012–2013: Sporting Al Riyadi Beirut (Lebanon-Div.A)
2013–2014: Sporting Al Riyadi Beirut (Lebanon-Div.A)
2015–2016: Sporting Al Riyadi Beirut (Lebanon-Div.A)
2016–2017: Byblos Club (Lebanon-Div.A,starting five)
2017–2018: Sporting Al Riyadi Beirut (Lebanon-Div.A, runner-up)
2018–2019: Sporting Al Riyadi Beirut (Lebanon-Div.A, champion)
2022-2023: Dyamo Beirut (Lebanon-Div.A)

Awards and achievements 
Lebanese Basketball League Champion -2005, 2006, 2007, 2008, 2009, 2010, 2011, 2014 
Asian Championships in Doha -2005 (Silver) 
World Championships in Japan - 
Asia-Basket.com All-Lebanese League Domestic Player of the Year -2009
Asia-Basket.com All-Arab Club Championships 2nd Team -2009
World Championships in Turkey - 2nd Best Stealer of the Tournament.
6 retired by Sporting Al Riyadi Beirut

References

External links 
 http://www.asia-basket.com/player.asp?Cntry=Lebanon&PlayerID=33686

1983 births
Living people
2006 FIBA World Championship players
2010 FIBA World Championship players
Asian Games competitors for Lebanon
Basketball players at the 2006 Asian Games
Lebanese men's basketball players
Point guards
Basketball players from Ottawa
Al Riyadi Club Beirut basketball players